Leon Palmer "Lee" Williams (June 27, 1918 – June 11, 1997) was an American basketball coach and executive. He coached at Colby College from 1946 to 1965, and later was the executive director of the Naismith Memorial Basketball Hall of Fame. He is a member of the Maine Sports Hall of Fame.  In 1985, he received the John Bunn Award.

References

1918 births
1997 deaths
American men's basketball coaches
American men's basketball players
Basketball coaches from New York (state)
Basketball players from New York (state)
Colby Mules men's basketball coaches
College men's basketball head coaches in the United States
Cortland Red Dragons men's basketball players
People from Oswego, New York